Snapaka Yohannan is a 1963 Indian Malayalam-language film about John the Baptist, directed and produced by P. Subramaniam. The film stars Jose Prakash, Prem Nazir, Thikkurissy Sukumaran Nair, Miss Kumari, S. P. Pillai, K. V. Shanthi, L. Vijayalakshmi and Adoor Pankajam. The film had musical score by Br. Lakshmanan.

Cast
 
Jose Prakash as Snaapaka Yohannaan 
Prem Nazir as Julius 
Thikkurissy Sukumaran Nair as Herodias Anthippas 
Adoor Pankajam as Cook 
G. K. Pillai as Pilate 
Kanchana 
Kottarakkara Sreedharan Nair as Naman
Miss Kumari as Miriam
Murali as Barabbas
S. P. Pillai as Samuel
K. V. Shanthi 
L. Vijayalakshmi as Salome

Soundtrack
The music was composed by Br. Lakshmanan and the lyrics were written by Thirunayinaarkurichi Madhavan Nair and Vayalar Ramavarma.

References

External links
 

1963 films
1960s Malayalam-language films
Films directed by P. Subramaniam
Films based on the Bible
Films based on the New Testament
Films based on the Gospels
Films about Christianity
Films set in Palestine (region)
Films set in Jerusalem
Films set in ancient Egypt
Films set in the Roman Empire
Films scored by Br Lakshmanan
Films about the Nativity of Jesus
Depictions of Herod the Great on film
Portrayals of Jesus in film
Portrayals of the Virgin Mary in film
The Devil in film
Cultural depictions of John the Baptist
Cultural depictions of the Biblical Magi
Cultural depictions of Pontius Pilate
Portrayals of Saint Joseph in film
Portrayals of Mary Magdalene in film
Cultural depictions of Saint Peter
Film portrayals of Jesus' death and resurrection
Cultural depictions of Judas Iscariot
Cultural depictions of Paul the Apostle
Cultural depictions of Salome
Christian mass media in India